Saund is a surname. Notable people with the surname include:

Dalip Singh Saund (1899–1973), American politician
Daz Saund, British club DJ and Remixer, active 1988–present

See also
Sand (surname)